Siyar Bahadurzada (born 17 April 1984) is a retired Afghan-born Dutch mixed martial artist who competed in the Welterweight division of the Ultimate Fighting Championship. He currently works as an instructor for Evolve MMA in Singapore. A professional competitor since 2001, he had also competed for World Victory Road, RINGS, and for Shooto, in which he held the title of Shooto Middleweight Champion.

Background
Bahadurzada was born in Kabul, Afghanistan, on 17 April 1984. His family experienced the Soviet–Afghan War and the Taliban's oppression. His family moved to the Netherlands in 1999. Bahadurzada's grandfather gave him the name "The Killer" when Siyar beat up kids who were older than him at a young age. Siyar began to train under Martijn de Jong at the Tatsujin dojo. De Jong is well respected in the Dutch community as an MMA authority and quickly took Bahadurzada as a student.

Mixed martial arts career

Early career
Bahadurzada trained under the Golden Glory association based in the Netherlands.

A veteran of the Shooto organization, he is the longtime Shooto Middleweight Champion. Bahadurzada made the transition to Japanese MMA by fighting for World Victory Road on their Sengoku events. He advanced to the semifinals of their Middleweight tournament but lost to Jorge Santiago.

On 27 August 2009 Siyar successfully defended his Shooto Middleweight Championship title against Leandro Silva in Shooto 13 by way of TKO (punches) in the first round.

Siyar fought and defeated Derrick Noble via first round KO, who was replacing his original opponent Nick Thompson at the Ultimate Glory 2010 event on 16 October 2010. Siyar fought veteran Canadian fighter John Alessio on 19 March 2011 and won his second straight fight by KO. The fight had started out slow for the first minute, until Bahadurzada landed a right hook and followed with a flurry of punches and knees. He won the tournament on 28 May 2011 by defeating Tommy Depret via TKO in the final round.

Siyar then signed a 4-fight contract with Strikeforce, but like many of the Golden Glory team signed to the organization, his promotional debut was delayed. Siyar gave an interview for Strikeforce, which can be heard on his Facebook profile. Bahadurzada waited for a fight from Strikeforce but never acquired a visa. He later commented in January 2011 on the scenario and expressed displeasure, saying he would never fight for the promotion. Scott Coker replied during an interview with Ariel Helwani by saying that Siyar had to first get a P1 visa.

Bahadurzada left Golden Glory in 2012 citing trust issues with the management. He signed a contract with AMC management and joined the Blackzilians team. In April 2014 Bahadurzada announced that he leaves the Blackzilians.

Ultimate Fighting Championship
On 30 September 2011 Siyar announced he had signed with the UFC. He was expected to face Erick Silva on 14 January 2012 at UFC 142.  However, Bahadurzada pulled out of the bout with an injury and was replaced by Carlo Prater.

Bahadurzada fought Paulo Thiago on 14 April 2012 at UFC on Fuel TV 2 and won by KO at 42 seconds of the first round, earning him Knockout of the Night honors, he became the first man to knock out Thiago.

Bahadurzada was expected to face Thiago Alves on 21 July 2012 at UFC 149, replacing an injured Yoshihiro Akiyama.  However, on 1 June Alves pulled out of the bout citing an injury  and was replaced by Chris Clements. Bahadurzada then himself had to withdraw from the fight due to a hand injury, and was replaced with Matthew Riddle.

Bahadurzada faced Dong Hyun Kim on 3 March 2013 at UFC on Fuel TV 8. He lost a lopsided decision after he was dominated by the grappling offense and ground and pound of Kim for all three rounds.

Bahadurzada was expected to face Robbie Lawler on 27 July 2013 at UFC on Fox 8, replacing an injured Tarec Saffiedine.  However, on 11 July it was announced that Bahadurzada also pulled out of the bout and was replaced by Bobby Voelker.

Bahadurzada faced John Howard on 28 December 2013 at UFC 168. He lost the fight via unanimous decision.

After over two years away from the sport, Bahadurzada returned to face Brandon Thatch on 5 March 2016 at UFC 196. He won the fight by submission in the third round.

Bahadurzada was scheduled to face Cláudio Silva on 30 July 2016 at UFC 201. However, Silva was forced out of the bout with an injury and replaced by Jorge Masvidal. In turn, Bahadurzada pulled out of the bout on 12 July, citing an illness.

After another year away from competition Bahadurzada was expected to face Abu Azaitar on 2 September 2017 at UFC Fight Night: Struve vs. Volkov. However, Azaitar pulled out of the bout due to injury and was replaced by UFC newcomer Rob Wilkinson. Bahadurzada won the fight via TKO in the second round.

Bahadurzada faced Luan Chagas on 21 April 2018 at UFC Fight Night 128. He won the fight via knockout in the second round.  This win earned him the Performance of the Night bonus.

Bahadurzada faced Curtis Millender on 29 December 2018 at UFC 232. He lost the fight via unanimous decision.

Bahadurzada was scheduled  to face Nordine Taleb on 4 May 2019 at UFC Fight Night: Iaquinta vs. Cowboy.  However, it was reported on 24 April 2019 that Bahadurzada pulled out of the bout citing injury, and he is replaced by newcomer Kyle Prepolec.

Bahadurzada faced Ismail Naurdiev on 28 September 2019 at UFC on ESPN+ 18.  He lost the fight via unanimous decision.

In June 2020, Siyar announced that he was retiring.

Coaching career
On 13 January 2020 Singapore-based mixed martial arts team Evolve MMA announced that Bahadurzada had been appointed as the new head coach.

Championships and achievements

Mixed martial arts
Ultimate Fighting Championship
Knockout of the Night (One time) vs. Paulo Thiago
Performance of the Night (One time) vs. Luan Chagas
Professional Shooto Japan
Shooto Middleweight Championship (One time)
Two successful title defenses
United Glory
2010/2011 World Series Welterweight Tournament Winner
Shooto Holland
2003 Light Heavyweight Tournament Winner

Mixed martial arts record

|-
|Loss
|align=center|24–8–1
|Ismail Naurdiev
|Decision (unanimous)
|UFC Fight Night: Hermansson vs. Cannonier 
|
|align=center|3
|align=center|5:00
|Copenhagen, Denmark
|
|-
|Loss
|align=center|24–7–1
|Curtis Millender
|Decision (unanimous)
|UFC 232 
|
|align=center|3
|align=center|5:00
|Inglewood, California, United States
|  
|- 
|Win
|align=center|24–6–1
|Luan Chagas
|KO (kick to the body and punch)
|UFC Fight Night: Barboza vs. Lee
|
|align=center|2
|align=center|2:40
|Atlantic City, New Jersey, United States
|
|-
|Win
|align=center|23–6–1
|Rob Wilkinson
|TKO (punches)
|UFC Fight Night: Volkov vs. Struve 
|
|align=center|2
|align=center|3:10
|Rotterdam, Netherlands
|
|-
|Win
|align=center|22–6–1
|Brandon Thatch
|Submission (arm-triangle choke)
|UFC 196
|
|align=center|3
|align=center|4:11
|Las Vegas, Nevada, United States
|
|-
| Loss
| align=center| 21–6–1
| John Howard
| Decision (unanimous)
| UFC 168
| 
| align=center|3
| align=center|5:00
| Las Vegas, Nevada, United States
| 
|-
| Loss
| align=center| 21–5–1
| Dong Hyun Kim
| Decision (unanimous)
| UFC on Fuel TV: Silva vs. Stann
| 
| align=center| 3
| align=center| 5:00
| Saitama, Japan
| 
|-
| Win
| align=center| 21–4–1
| Paulo Thiago
| KO (punch)
| UFC on Fuel TV: Gustafsson vs. Silva
| 
| align=center| 1
| align=center| 0:42
| Stockholm, Sweden
| 
|-
| Win
| align=center| 20–4–1
| Tommy Depret
| TKO (punches)
| United Glory: 2010/2011 World Series Finals
| 
| align=center| 2
| align=center| 4:16
| Moscow, Russia
| 
|-
| Win
| align=center| 19–4–1
| John Alessio
| TKO (punches and knees)
| United Glory: 2010/2011 World Series Semifinals
| 
| align=center| 1
| align=center| 1:55
| Charleroi, Belgium
| 
|-
| Win
| align=center| 
| Derrick Noble
| TKO (punches)
| United Glory: 2010/2011 World Series Quarterfinals
| 
| align=center| 1
| align=center| 1:54
| Amsterdam, Netherlands
| 
|-
| Win
| align=center| 17–4–1
| Carlos Alexandre Pereira
| KO (punch)
| Shooto Brasil 17
| 
| align=center| 1
| align=center| 1:34
| Rio de Janeiro, Brazil
| 
|-
| Win
| align=center| 16–4–1
| Robert Jocz
| Decision (majority)
| Ultimate Glory 11: A Decade of Fights
| 
| align=center| 3
| align=center| 5:00
| Amsterdam, Netherlands
| 
|-
| Win
| align=center| 15–4–1
| Leandro Batata
| TKO (punches)
| Shooto Brasil 13
| 
| align=center| 1
| align=center| 3:14
| Fortaleza, Brazil
| 
|-
| Loss
| align=center| 14–4–1
| Jorge Santiago
| Submission (heel hook)
| World Victory Road Presents: Sengoku 6
| 
| align=center| 1
| align=center| 1:10
| Saitama, Japan
| 
|-
| Win
| align=center| 14–3–1
| Evangelista Santos
| TKO (arm injury)
| World Victory Road Presents: Sengoku 5
| 
| align=center| 1
| align=center| 0:22
| Tokyo, Japan
| 
|-
| Loss
| align=center| 13–3–1
| Kazuo Misaki
| Submission (guillotine choke)
| World Victory Road Presents: Sengoku First Battle
| 
| align=center| 2
| align=center| 2:02
| Tokyo, Japan
| 
|-
| Win
| align=center| 13–2–1
| Nathan Schouteren
| Submission (punches)
| Ultimate Glory 6: Ede's Best against the Rest
| 
| align=center| 1
| align=center| 4:17
| Ede, Netherlands
| 
|-
| Win
| align=center| 12–2–1
| Shiko Yamashita
| Decision (unanimous)
| Shooto: Back To Our Roots 4
| 
| align=center| 3
| align=center| 5:00
| Tokyo, Japan
| 
|-
| Win
| align=center| 11–2–1
| Kurt Verschueren
| TKO (soccer kicks)
| Ultimate Glory 3: Upside Down
| 
| align=center| 1
| align=center| 0:55
| Rotterdam, Netherlands
| 
|-
| Win
| align=center| 10–2–1
| Rody Trost
| TKO (punches)
| Staredown City
| 
| align=center| 2
| align=center| 3:19 
| Amsterdam, Netherlands
| 
|-
| Win
| align=center| 9–2–1
| Rolandas Agrba
| Submission (rear-naked choke)
| Ultimate Glory 2
| 
| align=center| 1
| align=center| 0:26
| Amsterdam, Netherlands
| 
|-
| Win
| align=center| 8–2–1
| Dennis de Rus
| Decision (unanimous)
| Kickboxing Gala Free-Fight
| 
| align=center| 3
| align=center| 3:00
| Beverwijk, Netherlands
| 
|-
| Win
| align=center| 7–2–1
| Alexander Penao
| Submission (heel hook)
| Shooto Holland 4
| 
| align=center| 1
| align=center|3:31 
| Barneveld, Netherlands
| 
|-
| Loss
| align=center| 6–2–1
| Stefan Klever
| Decision (unanimous)
| Rings Holland: Born Invincible
| 
| align=center| 2
| align=center| 5:00
| Utrecht, Netherlands
| 
|-
| Loss
| align=center| 6–1–1
| Nathan Schouteren
| Decision (unanimous)
| Shooto Holland: Knock-Out Gala 3
| 
| align=center| 2
| align=center| 5:00
| Vlissingen, Netherlands
| 
|-
| Draw
| align=center| 6–0–1
| Patrick Vallee
| Draw (split)
| Shooto Holland: Fight Night
| 
| align=center| 2
| align=center| 5:00
| Vlissingen, Netherlands
| 
|-
| Win
| align=center| 6–0
| Arschak Dahabagian
| Decision (unanimous)
| Shooto Holland: On Tour 4
| 
| align=center| 2
| align=center| 5:00
| Ede, Netherlands
| 
|-
| Win
| align=center| 5–0
| Dennis van Asselt
| Submission (north-south choke)
| Shooto Holland: 4-Man Tournament
| 
| align=center| 1
| align=center| 2:23
| Goes, Netherlands
| 
|-
| Win
| align=center| 4–0
| Sebastiaan Rijtslag
| Submission (rear-naked choke)
| Shooto Holland: 4-Man Tournament
| 
| align=center| 1
| align=center| 2:32
| Goes, Netherlands
| 
|-
| Win
| align=center| 3–0
| Hubert Veenendaal
| Submission (triangle choke)
| Shooto Holland: Holland vs. The World
| 
| align=center| 1
| align=center| 2:28
| Culemborg, Netherlands
| 
|-
| Win
| align=center| 2–0
| Mingoes Pelupessy
| KO (head kick)
| Shooto Holland: On Tour
| 
| align=center| 1
| align=center| 0:19
| Culemborg, Netherlands
| 
|-
| Win
| align=center| 1–0
| Marc Lange
| KO (punches)
| Beast of the East 4
| 
| align=center| 1
| align=center| 0:57
| Zutphen, Netherlands
| 
|-

See also
List of male mixed martial artists

References

External links

1984 births
Living people
Afghan emigrants to the Netherlands
Afghan male mixed martial artists
Dutch male mixed martial artists
Middleweight mixed martial artists
Sportspeople from Deventer
Sportspeople from Kabul
Sportspeople of Afghan descent
Welterweight mixed martial artists
Afghan male kickboxers
Ultimate Fighting Championship male fighters